"The Magnificent Seven" is a song by the English punk rock band the Clash. Released in 1981, it was the third single from the Clash's fourth album, Sandinista!. It reached number 34 on the UK Singles Chart.

Composition
The song was inspired by old school hip hop acts from New York City, like the Sugarhill Gang and Grandmaster Flash & the Furious Five. Rap was still a new and emerging music genre at the time, and the band, especially Mick Jones, was very impressed with it, so much so that Jones took to carrying a boombox around and got the nickname "Whack Attack".

"The Magnificent Seven" was recorded in April 1980 at Electric Lady Studios in New York City, built around a funky bass loop played by Norman Watt-Roy  of the Blockheads. Joe Strummer wrote the words on the spot, a technique that was also used to create Sandinista!'''s other rap track, "Lightning Strikes (Not Once But Twice)". This white rap single is earlier than Blondie's "Rapture" by six months. Strummer said of the group's encounter with hip hop:

Though it failed to chart in America, the song was a hit on underground and college radio. Music critic Jeff Chang wrote that in New York City, the song "had become an unlikely hit on the Black radio station, WBLS." Also popular were various dance remixes, including the official B-side ("The Magnificent Dance") and original DJ remixes. WBLS' "Dirty Harry" remix appears on various Clash bootlegs, including Clash on Broadway Disc 4: The Outtakes.

The single was reissued in 1981 with "Stop the World" as its B-side and with different sleeve art.

The Magnificent Dance
"The Magnificent Dance", released on 12 April 1981 by CBS in 12-inch single format, is the dance remix of "The Magnificent Seven". The maxi single was released in the UK featuring an edited version of "The Magnificent Seven" on side A, and in the U.S., where it was backed with the extended version of "The Cool Out". It is credited to "Pepe Unidos", a pseudonym for Strummer, Paul Simonon and manager Bernie Rhodes. "Pepe Unidos" also produced "The Cool Out", a remix of "The Call Up". This dance version "definitely capitalized on the funky groove of the original, adding in some very cool drumming."

In 2015, Pitchfork Media included the song on its "Early 80's Disco" playlist, saying "if they were bored with the USA in 1977, four years on, they were also bored with both punk and rock. Instead, they became infatuated with NYC street culture, from early hip-hop to post-disco. This dubbed-out disco remix of the lead track off of Sandinista!'' was a club hit and the record Larry Levan would use to fine tune the sound system at the Paradise Garage."

Track listing
7" vinyl (Europe)
 "The Magnificent Seven" – 3:33
 "The Magnificent Dance" – 3:26

7" vinyl (North America) / 12" vinyl (UK)
 "The Magnificent Seven" – 4:22
 "The Magnificent Dance" – 5:29

12" vinyl (Europe)
 "The Magnificent Seven (Special Remix)" – 2:16
 "The Magnificent Dance" – 5:29
 "The Call Up" – 4:50
 "The Cool Out" – 2:57

12" vinyl (US)
 "The Call Up" – 4:50
 "The Cool Out" – 2:57
 "The Magnificent Dance" – 5:36
 "The Magnificent Seven" – 2:16

12" vinyl promo (US)
 "The Magnificent Seven" – 5:31
 "Lightning Strikes (Not Once But Twice) – 4:49
 "One More Time" – 3:32
 "One More Dub" – 3:34

Personnel
 Joe Strummer – lead and backing vocals, electric piano
 Mick Jones – lead guitars, backing vocals, sound effects
 Topper Headon – drums, backing vocals
 Norman Watt-Roy – bass guitar

Charts

References

Sources
Books

 
 
 
 
 
 
 
 

Journals and magazines

 
 

Web

 

1980 songs
1981 singles
The Clash songs
CBS Records singles
Rap rock songs
Songs written by Mick Jones (The Clash)
Songs written by Topper Headon
Songs written by Joe Strummer